This is a list of finalists for the 2003 Archibald Prize for portraiture (listed is Artist – Title).

Finalists
Davida Allen – Philip Bacon, art dealer; reading a letter from Barry...
Rick Amor – Portrait of Lewis Miller
Danelle Bergstrom – Conversation with Margaret Olley
 Warren Breninger – Self-portrait
Peter Churcher – Loti and Victor Smorgon
Kevin Connor – Self-portrait
Adam Cullen – Jimmy Little
Lucy Culliton – Self with subject (cock)
Geoffrey Dyer – Richard Flanagan (Winner: Archibald Prize 2003)
 Martine Emdur – Claudia Karvan, Interior
David Fairbairn – Auto portrait DF
 Julie Fragar – J. Lucy in quinachridone magenta
Robert Hannaford – Rabbi Apple
Nicholas Harding – Portrait of Margaret Whitlam A.O.
 Ray Lawrence – Self
 Mathew Lynn – Hetti Perkins
Lewis Miller – Hazel
 Henry Mulholland – Dr Peter Elliott at home
 David Naseby – Adam Cullen
 Paul Procèe – PCD 2K03 (from the Faces series)
Jenny Sages – True Stories – Helen Garner
 Ian Smith – Ray Hughes having pre-dinner drinks with Ambroise Vollard...
 Nick Stathopoulos – Here's Mr. Squiggle
 Andrew Sullivan – The forgotten soldier
 Branca Uzur – Sandra Levy
 Ilya Volykhine – Coffee with Ken Unsworth
 John R Walker – John Wolseley
 Greg Warburton – Self portrait in Da Vinci T-Shirt
Jan Williamson – Rachel Ward (Winner: Packing Room Prize 2003)
 Susan Wyatt – Doris Pilkington (Nugi Garimarra)
 Huihai Xie – Bannerman
 Dalu Zhao – 'Lao Fei' Stephen Fitzgerald (Winner: People's Choice 2003)

See also
Previous year: List of Archibald Prize 2002 finalists
Next year: List of Archibald Prize 2004 finalists
List of Archibald Prize winners

External links
Archibald Prize 2003 finalists official website

2003
Archibald Prize 2003
Archibald Prize 2003
Archibald
Arch
Archibald
Archibald